Tungsram was a manufacturing company located in Hungary and known for their light bulbs and electronics. Established in Újpest (today part of Budapest, Hungary) in 1896, it initially produced telephones, wires and switchboards. The name "Tungsram" is a portmanteau of tungsten and wolfram, the two common names of the metal used for making light bulb filaments.
Before becoming nationalized by the Communist government in 1945, the company was the world's third largest manufacturer of light bulbs and radiotubes, after the American General Electric and RCA companies.

History
On 13 December 1904, Hungarian Sándor Just and Croatian Franjo Hanaman were granted Hungarian patent no. 34541 for the world's first tungsten filament bulb that lasted longer and produced brighter light than a carbon filament. The co-inventors licensed their patent to the company, which came to be named Tungsram after the eponymous tungsten incandescent bulbs, which are still called Tungsram bulbs in many European countries. In 1934, Tungsram incorporated a patent by Imre Bródy for bulbs filled with krypton gas, providing for longer bulb lifetime. During World War I mass production of radio tubes began and became the most profitable division of the company. 

In March 1937, the first television experimental broadcasts of still images (Tungsram trademark and Mickey Mouse) began in the  Tungsram laboratory, initially with low FPS. With the help of the charge storage video camera developed by the company, a successful continuous motion picture transmission was already tested in an experimental TV broadcasting station at Újpest  in June 1937.

Hungarian physicist Zoltán Bay together with György Szigeti pre-empted led lighting in Hungary in 1939 by patented a lighting device based on SiC, with an option on boron carbide, that emitted white, yellowish white, or greenish white depending on impurities present.

British Tungsram Radio Works was a subsidiary of Hungarian Tungsram in pre-war days.

In 1990, General Electric acquired a majority stake in Tungsram and over six years invested $600 million in the venture, thoroughly restructuring every aspect of its operations. To date, this has been the largest manufacturing investment by a U.S. firm in Central and Eastern Europe. Thereafter Tungsram operated as a subsidiary of General Electric and the name merely was retained as a brand.

As of February 2018, the CEO of GE Hungary, Jörg Bauer agreed to buy GEʼs lighting business in Europe, the Middle East, Africa and Turkey, as well as its global automotive lighting business. The business continues to operate again under the name Tungsram Group.

Since February 2020, the business partners of the company have been able to use the recently opened Tungsram Lounge at the Ferenc Liszt International Airport with conference rooms.

Factories in Hungary

 Budapest, Váci út - Light source factory
 Győr - Target machine design, production
 Nagykanizsa - Light Source Factory and Logistics Centre
 Kisvárda - Halogen and Automotive Lamp Factory
 Zalaegerszeg - Component factory
 Hajdúböszörmény - Component factory
 Budapest, Fóti út - Machinery Division, Vacuum Engineering Machine Factory (closed)
 Vác - Light source factory (closed)
 Kaposvár - Electron tube factory (closed)
 Hajdúnánás - Component factory (closed)

Famous engineers and inventors

Gallery

See also
Tungsram SC (sports club)

External links
 Free English language book about the detailed history of Tungsram:  
 Patent US1018502, Incandescent bodies for electric lamps

References

Hungarian brands
Lighting brands
General Electric acquisitions
Guitar amplification tubes
Manufacturing companies of Austria-Hungary
Manufacturing companies based in Budapest
1896 establishments in Austria-Hungary
1990 mergers and acquisitions
Former General Electric subsidiaries